Alec Sabin (born 28 August 1947) is a Yorkshire born British actor.

His television appearances include: Coronation Street, When the Boat Comes In, Tinker Tailor Soldier Spy, Maybury, Doctor Who, Bergerac, Call Me Mister and Birds of a Feather.

His theatre credits include the Royal Court Theatre and the Royal Shakespeare Company.

Partial filmography
La 7ème compagnie au clair de lune (1977)
S.O.S. Titanic (1979) - Crow's Nest Lookout: Frederick Fleet
Antony and Cleopatra (1981) - Dercetas
L'étincelle (1986) - Linsay

References

External links
 
  Alec Sabin's personal website
 Alec Sabin on LinkedIn
 Alec Sabin (@alecsabin) on Twitter

1947 births
Living people
British male television actors